Shrikant Bashir is a 2020 Indian edgy action-drama original series, premiered on streaming service SonyLIV on 11 December 2020. It was written by Shiraz Ahmed and helmed by Santosh Shetty, starring Gashmeer Mahajani, Pooja Gor, Ashmita Jaggi, and Yudhishthir Singh in the lead roles. Previously titled as SOT: Surgical Operation Team, the series follows the titular duo who work for an intelligence agency that secretly works to save India from national and international threats. It was made under the production house of Banijay Asia.

Cast

Main 

 Gashmeer Mahajani
 Pooja Gaur
 Ashmita Jaggi
 Yudhishthir Singh
 Bikramjeet Kanwarpal
 Mantra
 Mukul Dev

Recurring

Episodes

Season 1

Reception

Critical reviews 
The series received mixed reviews

Joginder Tuteja of Koimoi, a Bollywood entertainment website, rated the series at a 3/5, saying "Overall though, even if Shrikant Bashir may not go down as totally unique, what works in its favor is the fact that it is fast paced and ensures that audiences are hooked on to the proceedings. Notwithstanding the stock background score pieces that keep repeating themselves time and again, one can give this one as a comfortable watch with the entire family."

A reviewer for Mashable wrote "Gashmeer Mahajani and Yudhishtir Singh are on two ends of the acting spectrum in Shrikant Bashir and everyone else kind of falls somewhere in between."

The Quint says "The show moves at a steady pace and each episode has just the right amount of thrill and tension to hold the viewer’s attention. Every episode plays out like a perfectly crafted recipe that takes you a step closer to the season finale."

References

External links  

Indian action television series
SonyLIV original films